Thwaitesia argentiopunctata known as the sequined spider, mirror spider, or twin-peaked Thwaitesia is a species of spider found in all the states of Australia. The abdomen is attractively patterned with cream, green, yellow and red.

Description
These spiders, called mirror or sequined spiders, are all members of several different species of the genus Thwaitesia, which features spiders with reflective silvery patches on their abdomen. 
The scales look like solid pieces of mirror glued to the spider's back, but they can actually change size depending on how threatened the spider feels. The reflective scales are composed of reflective guanine, which these and other spiders use to give themselves color.

References

Theridiidae
Spiders of Australia
Spiders described in 1916
Taxa named by William Joseph Rainbow